The Battle of Valencia de Alcántara took place in August 1762 when an Anglo Portuguese force led by John Burgoyne surprised and captured the town of Valencia de Alcántara from its Spanish defenders during the Seven Years' War. The town was taken on 27 August as part of the defence against the Spanish invasion of Portugal.

The force that captured Almeida was part of a major Spanish offensive to overrun Portugal. A northern pincer invaded Portugal from Galicia crossing the Douro and threatening Porto while the southern force crossed the border from Ciudad Rodrigo. With Spain invading Portugal in support of France, Britain sent reinforcements to aid the Portuguese; in total around 8,000 men led by John Burgoyne.

On 24 August Count of Lippe decided to attack the Spanish town of Valencia de Alcántara which was a main supply base for the invasion. He sent John Burgoyne, a colonel of the 16th Light Dragoons now local rank of brigadier general with an Anglo-Portuguese contingent of around 2,800 men (400 light dragoons, six British infantry companies of the 3rd Regiment of Foot, eleven Portuguese grenadiers companies, two howitzers and two light guns). Burgoyne passed the Tagus at Abrantes. At Castelo de Vide, Burgoyne was joined by 100 Portuguese foot, 50 irregular cavalry and about 40 armed peasants.

On 27 August, after a forced march totalling 45 miles, they attacked and captured the town surprising the Spanish defenders; Burgoyne leading his cavalry with effect. Once the town had been captured the British and Portuguese quickly cleared the neighbourhood of the Spanish troops, taking a number of prisoners including a Spanish general. In all several companies of the Spanish regiment of Seville which were garrisoning the frontier town was effectively annihilated. In addition the town was left undamaged and had to pay a ransom of a year's taxes in corn.

This little victory raised Portuguese morale. Burgoyne was given a large diamond and the Spanish Colours were captured. The victory also set back the invasion and contributing to the general victory that year. Two months later he defeated the Spanish again at the battle of Vila Velha.

References

Bibliography
 Jaques, Tony. Dictionary of Battles and Sieges. Greenwood Press, 2007
 Kirby, Mike, The Portuguese Army - Seven Years War, Seven Years War Association Journal, Vol. XII No. 3
 Pereira Sales, Ernesto Augusto; O Conde de Lippe em Portugal, Vila Nova de Famalicao: Publicacoes da Comissao de Historia Militar, 1936, pp. 55–62

See also
 Great Britain in the Seven Years War

Valencia de Alcantara (1762)
Valencia de Alcantara (1762)
Valencia de Alcantara (1762)
Battles of the Seven Years' War
Conflicts in 1762
1762 in Portugal
1762 in Spain